Simanga Happy Mbuyane is a South African politician who has served as a member of the National Assembly of South Africa since 2017, representing the African National Congress.

Parliamentary career
Mbuyane had stood unsuccessfully for Parliament in 2014 as the 139th candidate on the ANC's national list. On 4 May 2017, Mbuyane was sworn in as a member of the National Assembly. He replaced former minister Ngoako Ramatlhodi who had resigned as a Member of Parliament after he was axed in an unexpected cabinet reshuffle in March 2017.

Mbuyane stood as an ANC parliamentary candidate in Mpumalanga in the 2019 national election and was elected back to Parliament at the election. He is a member of the Portfolio Committee on Trade and Industry.

In October 2020, Mbuyane unsuccessfully attempted to exclude the public from attending a virtual committee meeting of the Portfolio Committee on Trade and Industry to discuss the appointment process of a new  National Lotteries Commission (NLC) chairperson. Mbuyane said that the committee had agreed to hold the meeting in private but it was then pointed out to him that portfolio committee meetings are public by default.

References

External links
Profile at Parliament of South Africa

Living people
Year of birth missing (living people)
Place of birth missing (living people)
People from Mpumalanga
African National Congress politicians
Members of the National Assembly of South Africa